Maiden Voyage may refer to:
 Maiden Voyage (Herbie Hancock album), released 1965
 "Maiden Voyage" (composition), the album's title track
Maiden Voyage (Ramsey Lewis album), released 1968
Maiden Voyage (Alice in Videoland album), released 2003
 Maiden Voyage, a 2004 album by Bounding Main
 Maiden Voyage (Salyu album), released 2010 by Salyu 
 "Maiden Voyage", the seventy-first episode of Code Lyoko 
 Maiden Voyage (novel), a novel by Denton Welch